Ferryhill was a railway station located in Ferryhill in County Durham, Northeast England.

History
The Clarence Railway reached the town of Ferryhill when its main line from Stockton and  opened to mineral traffic on 16 January 1834, and was first served by passenger trains on 11 July 1835. The first station was developed by the Clarence on the current site in 1840, serving a town population of 850. The position was chosen as it lay close to both natural deposits of coal and limestone. The 1829 Clarence Railway Act gave the Clarence powers to construct branches to Wingate for the City of Durham, Sherburn and  although only the latter of these ever reached its intended destinations. The Sherburn Branch was only opened as far as  whilst the City of Durham Branch made it no further than Thrislington.

The Clarence Railway Byers Green Branch was opened to mineral traffic on 31 March 1837, despite construction not being officially completed for a further 4 years, due to a clause in the railway's Act requiring the line to be opened no later than 1837.

The Clarence also developed a goods yard on the site, which would later become one of the busiest in Europe between the 1920s and the 1950s.

Whilst the railway had obtained powers to cross and join the GNER, it had failed to do the same for its crossing and joining of the Clarence. The completion of the GNEC&HJR would have provided a shorter route to the coast than the Clarence and thus have a serious impact on its profitability. Because of this oversight by the GNEC&HJR, the Clarence was able to delay the line's completion by 7 years by which point the GNEC&HJR had been leased by the HD&R before both companies were leased by the York & Newcastle Railway. A passenger service over the GNEC&HJR was finally introduced on 13 October 1846 though this required a reversal at Thinford Junction until the NER opened a south to west curve in 1873.

To allow the NER to make the station a stop for trains to and from Edinburgh to London King's Cross that company rebuilt the station as an island platform at a cost of £13,612 in June 1887. These services were continued when the station became part of the London and North Eastern Railway in 1923.

To allow for better servicing of locomotives in the area, the NER built an adjacent engine shed in 1871, which as the coal mines in the area declined was closed from 1938.

In 1902 Bolckow Vaughan sank the Dean and Chapter Colliery just south of the station, which until its closure in 1969 provided much of the station's traffic. The development included a coking coal works, which closed in 1930. In 1946 both Dean and Chapter and the local Mainsforth Colliery were nationalised and taken over by the National Coal Board.

Ferryhill railway station was once one of the busiest goods yards in Europe.

Closure
The service to Coxhoe along the truncated Sherburn branch was withdrawn by the NER as early as 1902 though the line remained open to goods traffic until 1966. Passenger services on the Byers Green branch were withdrawn beyond  on 4 December 1939 and ended completely on 31 March 1952. The other branch lines radiating from Ferryhill were progressively closed between the 1940s and 1950s with the Leamside Line closing to local traffic on 28 July 1941, the former Clarence Railway main line to Stockton losing passenger services on 31 March 1952 and passenger services on the former GNEC&HJR route to  being withdrawn on 9 June of the same year.

In 1963 as part of the Beeching Axe, it was recommended that the station close. However, strong local opposition resulted in the station remaining open for passengers until 6 March 1967. It remained open as a goods-only station, but after the closure of Dean and Chapter in 1969, the station burnt down. The demolition contractors for the colliery in the 1970s also demolished the residual station building structures.

Present and Future
Little remains of the former station in 2014, although freight trains still service the Lafarge cement works at Thrislington Quarry to the north, which is scheduled to be redeveloped as a landfill site.  The junction between the ECML and line to Stockton & Middlesbrough remains in use, though the latter route is only open for freight traffic and occasional diversions.

After the MP for Sedgefield, Paul Howell, raised the issue in the House of Commons in June 2020, a petition was launched to request the reopening of the station in August of that year and, in the November, the Department for Transport awarded up to £50,000 from the Restoring Your Railway Fund for an initial study to investigate the feasibility of the proposal.

References

Bibliography
 

Disused railway stations in County Durham
Former North Eastern Railway (UK) stations
Railway stations in Great Britain opened in 1840
Railway stations in Great Britain closed in 1967
Beeching closures in England
Ferryhill